The Welsh Group is an artists' collective, with the purpose of exhibiting and "giving a voice" to the visual arts in Wales.

Beginnings
The group began in 1948 as the South Wales Group, consisting of both professional and amateur artists. The group's initial conception was a response to the Royal Cambrian Academy's relatively weak representation from south Wales at that time. In the foreword to the South Wales Group’s first exhibition catalogue, David Bell wrote "It is the purpose of the Group to establish a new link between the artists of South Wales and their public".

During the 1960s the South Wales Group had begun exhibiting further afield in north and mid Wales and into Bristol and Shrewsbury. The group adopted its current, broader title of The Welsh Group by 1975, by which time it had also become a fully professional artists' group and, though its south east tendency is still an issue of some contention, the group had expanded its membership beyond south Wales (including a number who are also members of the Royal Cambrian Academy and/or the 56 Group Wales, a splinter group initiated in 1956 when the South Wales Group failed to become a southern Academy).

21st century
An exhibition curated and researched by Welsh Group member Dr Ceri Thomas and funded by The National Library of Wales, Arts Council of Wales, Contemporary Art Society for Wales and the Welsh Group, was launched at the National Library of Wales, (Aberystwyth), before touring to the Royal Cambrian Academy, and Newport Museum & Art Gallery. The exhibition, Mapping The Welsh Group at 60, included work by current and past members spanning a period from soon after the second world war to work completed in the twenty-first century, just after Welsh devolution. At the exhibition launch Welsh Government Heritage Minister at the time Alun Ffred Jones highlighted the group's importance: "The Welsh Group's 60th anniversary exhibition is a major event for the arts in Wales, bringing together work from talented Welsh artists old and new". A fully illustrated colour book published by Diglot Books accompanied the exhibition.
Today the group exhibits in Wales and internationally, including recent exchange exhibitions with visual art groups in the USA and Germany.

Membership

Full membership is made up of approximately 40 Welsh or Wales-based artists, including:

 Mathew Prichard
 Sue Hiley Harris
 Paul Edwards
 Neil Stone
 Heather Eastes
 Anthony Evans
 Veronica Gibson
 Chris Griffin
 Jacqueline Jones
 Angela Kingston
 Gus Payne
 Jacqueline Alkema
 Jenny Allan
 Lynne Bebb
 Simone Bizzell-Browning
 Paul Brewer
 Glenys Cour
 Ivor Davies
 Ken Dukes
 Wendy Earl
 Lorna Edmiston
 Ken Elias
 Robert Harding
 Mary Husted
 Dilys Jackson
 Maggie James
 Kay Keogh
 Robert Macdonald
 Shirley Anne Owen
 Roy Powell
 Sue Roberts
 Gerda Roper
 Alan Salisbury
 Philippine Sowerby
 Thomasin Toohie
 Jean Walcot
 Pip Woolf
 Karin Mear

The chair is Sue Hiley Harris, the secretary David James and the treasurer Heather Eastes. Since 2002, with the deaths of a number of long lasting members, new members were elected, resulting in a greater gender balance and an increase in members from outside Cardiff.

From 2007 the group has included a graduate member and in 2012 artist Tiff Oben began a three-year Fellowship with the group.

Mathew Prichard CBE is the group's president.

Former members
Former members have included major names from the field of modern Welsh art including Peter Bailey, William Brown, Brenda Chamberlain, Mary Fogg, Arthur Giardelli, Tony Goble, Bert Isaac, John Petts, David Tinker, Laurie Williams and Ernest Zobole.

Publications

References

External links
The Welsh Group website

Welsh art
Welsh artist groups and collectives
Arts organizations established in 1948
1948 establishments in Wales
20th-century Welsh painters
21st-century Welsh painters
Welsh sculptors
20th-century British sculptors